Erastes is the pen name of a female author from the United Kingdom, known for writing gay-themed historical and romantic fiction.

Erastes initially began writing gay fiction after initially having a start writing slash fiction set in the Harry Potter universe. She was also a director of the Erotic Authors Association (EAA) and the association flourished until 2010 when she handed the EAA over to new management.

Her best known works include Frost Fair, a bestselling novella published by Cheyenne Publishing in 2009, and Transgressions, a novel which was released in 2009 by Running Press in their M/M Historical Romance line and was a shortlisted nominee for a 2010 Lambda Literary Award in the Gay Romance category.

Bibliography

Novels
 Standish. A homoerotic Regency romance (2006)
 Transgressions (2009)
 Mere Mortals (2011)

Novellas
 Hard & Fast, anthology: Speak Its Name, published by Cheyenne Publishing, 2009,  
 Frost Fair, published by Cheyenne Publishing, 2009,    
 Tributary, anthology: The Last Gasp, published by Noble Romance Publishing, 2010, 
 Muffled Drum, published by Carina Press 2011, ASIN: B005078OKG

Short stories
 "Whatever the Risk", anthology: Queered Dimensions, Queered Fiction
 "The Blue Train", anthology: Riding the Rails (Bold Strokes Books)
 "Drug Colours", anthology: Best Gay Short Stories (Lethe Press)
 "Show Don't Tell", MEN Magazine, March 2008
 "Fire & Ice", anthology: J is for Jealousy (Cleis Press)
 "Lifeline", anthology: Cruise Lines (Alyson Books)
 "Drug Color", anthology: Where the Boys Are (Cleis Press)
 "Ribinks", Drabbler Magazine
 "The Bird", anthology: Fast Balls (Alyson Books)
 "Matelotage", anthology: Treasure Trail (Alyson Books)
 "Lucky", anthology: Love in a Lock Up (Starbooks)
 "In the Dark", anthology: Ultimate Gay Erotica 2007 (Alyson Books)
 "My Best Customer", anthology: Travelrotica (Alyson Books)
 "Ten Kisses", anthology Connections (Iris Print)
 "Bright Souls", anthology: Ultimate Gay Erotica 2005 (Alyson Books)
 "Sin of the Tongue", anthology: Blasphemy (Torquere Press)
 "I Will", anthology With This Ring I Thee Bed, (Spice, 2011)

References

External links
 
 

1959 births
Living people
English historical novelists
English women novelists
People educated at Southend High School for Girls
English romantic fiction writers
Women romantic fiction writers
Women historical novelists